Stewiacke is a town located in southern Colchester County, Nova Scotia, Canada. The town was incorporated on August 30, 1906.

Geography 
The town is located in the Stewiacke Valley, at the confluence of the Stewiacke and Shubenacadie Rivers, and is a service and support centre for local agricultural communities as well as a service exit on Highway 102.

The town is noted as being located halfway between the North Pole and the Equator (which is actually in Alton, Nova Scotia). Controversy in the past over that claim stems from the fact that the Earth is not a perfect sphere and so the halfway mark lies approximately 16 km north of the 45th parallel.

History
Stewiacke was named in the language of the local Mi'kmaq First Nations and is a word meaning "flowing out in small streams" and "winding river" or "whimpering or whining as it goes". During the French and Indian War, the British built Fort Ellis in the area to protect New England Planters from Mi'kmaq raids.

In the late 1990s, a tourism attraction named Mastodon Ridge opened near the town's highway exit, based on a local discovery of a mastodon skeleton. The Mastodon Ridge Complex features a craft store, toy store, a mini golf and interpretive centre which displays several of the mastodon's bones.

Stewiacke is home to a bar, a pharmacy, a grocery store, a pizzeria, numerous fast food restaurants, two gas stations, a hardware store, an 18-hole golf course and a newly built elementary school that consolidates 2 former local schools.

Stewiacke is also home to a volunteer fire brigade that was the first department in North America to use specialized foam as a fire suppression agent, alongside other achievements involving the implementation of certain fire apparatus.

The town's most notorious event occurred on April 12, 2001, when a local teenager, at home on a school in-service day, tampered with a railway switch on the CN Rail Halifax-Montreal mainline, causing Via Rail Canada's Ocean to derail several minutes later when it passed through the centre of the community.  Several buildings and rail cars were destroyed and many people were injured, including some severely, although no fatalities resulted.

Demographics 

Parks & Trails 

 Dennis Park
 Stewiacke River Park
 Stewiacke Recreation Grounds
 Barking Lot - Off Leash Dog Park
 John Crawford Trail
 Stewiacke River Country Trail
 Fish Shack Trail
 Caddell Rapids Lookoff Provincial Park

Notable residents
 Hanson Dowell (1906–2000), president of the Canadian Amateur Hockey Association and member of the Nova Scotia House of Assembly

See also
 List of municipalities in Nova Scotia

References

External links

 Town of Stewiacke

Communities in Colchester County
Towns in Nova Scotia